The Numismatist (formerly Numismatist) is the monthly publication of the American Numismatic Association. The Numismatist contains articles written on such topics as coins, tokens, medals, paper money, and stock certificates. All members of the American Numismatic Association receive the publication as part of their membership benefits.

History
The inaugural issue was a four-page leaflet originally published in 1888 by collector Dr. George F. Heath in Monroe, Michigan, as The American Numismatist. The name was changed to The Numismatist soon after. The name was purchased by the American Numismatic Association many years later when the organization began to print a monthly publication for the benefit of its members.

In December 2015, the ANA announced it had digitized every issue of the magazine.

In April 2020, longtime editor Barbara J. Gregory retired after 32 years as editor-in-chief and 39 years on the staff. She was succeeded in the position by Caleb Noel.

Content
As one of the leading numismatic publications, The Numismatist features several columns from its writers focusing on a wide range of topics. In addition to letters from the organization's president, the editor, letters to the editor, and values for select coin series, each issue includes:

USA Coin Album – Column focusing on various U.S. coin series
American Classics – Focusing on various popular defunct U.S. coin series such as Franklin half dollars
Auctions – Focusing on historic coin and paper money auctions in history
News & Notes – New releases from American and world mints
ANA News – News and happenings from the Association, including convention recaps
Money Museum – Highlighting the Edward C. Rochette Money Museum
Bookmarks – Reviews of new numismatic literature
Counterfeit Detection – Column by NGC
Coins and Collectors – Q. David Bowers' monthly column on numismatic history (1965–2021)
Around the World – World coin convention news
Early American Money – Ray Williams' column on colonial, post-colonial and early U.S. coinage
Numismatic Chronicles – Nancy Oliver and Richard Kelly column on coin series and historical hoards
Getting Started – A column of advice for collectors
Quiz Quarters – Trivia and games, such as crossword puzzles
Humor – Column by Jerry Cestkowski

Each issue also features an obituaries section to honor recently deceased ANA members.

Distribution
All members of the Association receive the magazine as part of their membership benefits: gold members receive a digital subscription while platinum members receive a print subscription.

In October 2019, Barnes & Noble announced that The Numismatist would be sold at over 600 stores nation-wide to increase circulation.

References

External links

American Numismatic Association
Current issue online

1888 establishments in Michigan
Hobby magazines published in the United States
Monthly magazines published in the United States
Magazines established in 1888
Magazines published in Colorado
Magazines published in Michigan
Mass media in Colorado Springs, Colorado
Numismatics journals